The 2009–10 WRU Challenge Cup: Tier 3, known for sponsorship reasons as the SWALEC Bowl, is the 2nd WRU Challenge Cup: Tier 3, the annual national rugby union cup competition for lower division teams of Wales.

Calendar

Matches

Round 1

Round 2

Round 3

Round 4

Round 5

Finals

Quarter-finals

Semi-finals

Final

External links
 WRU

Challenge Cup
WRU Challenge Cup
Wales cup 3